Markos Maragoudakis (born 28 January 1982) is a Greek-Congolese professional footballer who plays for Euklis Soronis.

References

1982 births
Living people
Greek footballers
Democratic Republic of the Congo people of Greek descent
Greek expatriate footballers
Greek expatriates in Cyprus
Ethnikos Piraeus F.C. players
PAS Giannina F.C. players
A.P.O. Akratitos Ano Liosia players
Rodos F.C. players
Platanias F.C. players
Panachaiki F.C. players
Aris Limassol FC players
Super League Greece players
Cypriot First Division players
Cypriot Second Division players
Association football forwards
Footballers from Rethymno